The 2019 Inter Games Football Tournament was an association football tournament which was held between 15 and 22 June 2019 in Anglesey, Wales. It was organised due to the hosts of the 2019 Island Games, Gibraltar being unable to run a tournament due to lack of pitches. As football is one of the most popular sports at the games it was decided to hold the matches elsewhere, albeit with the results not officially part of the Island Games history.

It was announced on 1 May 2018 that the Welsh island had been chosen as the preferred venue to host. In August of that year 12 clubs put forward their names to hold matches and the draw for both the men's and women's competitions were made on 19 November by Wayne Hennessey and Osian Roberts. The sponsors of the games were Anglesey based Huws Gray builders merchants.

Men's
The men's tournament will start as a group Round-robin tournament followed by knock out games.

Group stage

Group A

Group B

Group C

Ranking of second-placed teams
Joining the three group winners in the semi-finals, the final semi-final slot is awarded to the best-ranked runner-up. As Group A contained one more team than the other groups, the result of the Group A runner-up against the Group A fourth-placed team is not taken into consideration. This was Jersey's 7–0 win over the Western Isles.

Knock-out stage

9th place play-off

7th place play-off

5th place play-off

Semi-finals

Bronze medal play-off

Final

Final rankings

Women's

The women's tournament will be two groups of three teams. There were originally to be five teams in one group but on 8 February 2019 it was confirmed that Gibraltar would take part as an additional entrant.

Group stage

Group A

Group B

Knock-out stage

5th place play-off

Semi-finals

Bronze medal play-off

Final

Final rankings

References

External links
Tournament official website
2019 Island Games official site

International association football competitions hosted by Wales
2019 in women's association football
2019 in association football
Inter Games Football
Island Games
Sport in Anglesey